Filopaludina filosa is a species of large freshwater snail with a gill and an operculum, an aquatic gastropod mollusk in the family Viviparidae.

Distribution 
This species is found in Cambodia, Laos, Myanmar, Thailand and Vietnam.

Description

References

Viviparidae